Ahmadabad-e Olya (also Romanized as Aḩmadābād-e ‘Olyā; also known as Aḩmadābād) is a village in Khezel-e Sharqi Rural District, Khezel District, Nahavand County, Hamadan Province, Iran. At the 2006 census, its population was 105, in 26 families.

References 

Populated places in Nahavand County